Patrick Dewaere (26 January 1947 – 16 July 1982) was a French film actor. Born in Saint-Brieuc, Côtes-d'Armor, he was the son of French actress Mado Maurin. Actor from a young age, his career lasted more than 21 years, until his suicide in Paris, in 1982.

Career

Early life 
Patrick Dewaere was the third child of an actors family. Under the direction of his mother, Mado Maurin, Patrick, his four brothers and his sister played in movies and television series. The family lived in Paris. Dewaere attended the Cours Hattemer, a private school.

One of his first TV appearances was in 1961, when he was 14 years old. He appeared in a video for the song "Nuits d'Espagne" by Dalida.  Later, he was a promising and popular French actor in the late 1960s and 1970s.

Debuts as "Patrick Dewaere" 
At the age of 17, Dewaere learned that he was not the biological child of his mother’s ex-husband, Pierre-Marie Bourdeaux, but that of conductor and singer Michel Têtard. In 1968, he took the name of "Dewaere" which his maternal great-grandmother inspired him. A year earlier, he had met his first wife, Sotha, an actress who co-founded the Café de la Gare, an experimental theatre. They separated in 1970 but remained married for eleven years.

From 1968, he collaborated with the Café de la Gare, where he met Miou-Miou and Gérard Depardieu, with whom he made a breakthrough after many secondary roles in various films, in the scandalous comedy Going Places. Miou-Miou became Dewaere’s companion and the mother of his daughter Angèle (1974). She left Dewaere for singer Julien Clerc, shortly before the shooting of F...like Fairbanks, in which both play a couple in separation.

Success and depression 
Patrick Dewaere became one of the most popular actors in French cinema in the 1970s. Between 1977 and 1982, he was nominated five times to the Césars in the "Best Actor" category, the most important award in France. In his work, Dewaere was restless and very conscientious, which may have caused his depressed mood. He also had serious drug problems, and it is known that he had been sexually abused as a child. He consolidated his status as a savage and ruthless actor in Alain Corneau’s cult film Série noire (1979). In his roles, Dewaere was long attached to the kind of young rebel. Only in his later films did his comic and dramatic diversity manifest itself. He often worked with director Bertrand Blier.

In 1980, Dewaere hit a journalist who had announced against his will his union with Elsa Chalier. Subsequently, the actor was ignored by the French press, his name was even abbreviated with his initials (P.D).

Personal life
For eleven years Dewaere was married to French actress Sotha. In the early 1970s, he became the companion of French actress Miou-Miou, until they separated in 1976. They had one daughter. Shortly before the release of Paradis Pour Tous (1982), a black comedy where his character tries to commit suicide, the actor shot himself in his house in Paris. He was 35 years old.

He is the father of French actress Lola Dewaere.

Death 
Elsa Chalier left him in 1982 for his best friend Coluche. Shortly afterwards, on July 16, 1982, Dewaere shot himself in his house in Paris. He also had financial and addiction problems. At the time, he was preparing for the film Édith et Marcel by Claude Lelouch, where he should have played the boxer Marcel Cerdan. After Dewaere’s death, his son, Marcel Cerdan Jr, joined Évelyne Bouix, who played Edith Piaf.

He was buried in the cemetery of Saint-Lambert-du-Lattay, in the grave of his in-laws.

Distinctions 

In 1975, Dewaere received the Crystal Star of the Best Actor for The Best Way to Walk, shared with Patrick Bouchitey. This "half trophy" was the only award the profession gave him.

Between 1976 and 1982, the Académie des arts et techniques du cinéma français nominated the actor six times for the César, but never gave him the award:

1976: César nomination for Best Supporting Actor, Adieu Poulet.
1977: César nomination for Best Actor, The Best Way to Walk.
1978: César nomination for Best Actor, Le Juge Fayard dit Le Shériff.
1980: César nomination for Best Actor, Série noire.
1981: César nomination for Best Actor, Un mauvais fils.
1982: César nomination for Best Actor, Stepfather.

The 1978 Academy Award for Best Foreign Film was awarded to Bertrand Blier's Get Out Your Handkerchiefs, due in part to the performance of its stars, Dewaere and Depardieu.

Legacy

In cinema 
 The actor was the subject of the French documentary Patrick Dewaere, which was shown at the 1992 Cannes Film Festival.

 In Michel Gondry’s film La Science des rêves (2006), the hero played by Gael García Bernal metamorphoses into Patrick Dewaere during a scene and replays several major scenes from the film Série noire. The title of the original soundtrack accompanying this sequence is Rêve Patrick Dewaere.

In music 
1982: Friend of Dewaere, Murray Head signs the song Shades of the Prison House in the album Shade, which will be taken as soundtrack of the film Patrick Dewaere, directed by Marc Esposito in 1992.
1983: Louis Chedid evokes the memory of the actor in his song Les absents sont toujours tort.
1983: Catherine Lara also paid tribute to him, with the title T'es pas drôle.
1994: Christian Décamps on the album Nu with the song Impasse du Moulin Vert.
1996: In the song Nirvana of the album Premières Consultations, Doc Gynéco writes: «J'vais me foutre en l'air comme Patrick Dewaere» ("I'm gonna kill myself like Patrick Dewaere").
2002: Renaud evokes Dewaere in his song Mon bistrot préféré on the album Boucan d'enfer.
2005: Raphael pays tribute to him with his Chanson pour Patrick Dewaere on the album Caravane.
The Schneider-Dewaere Double Prize rewards the male and female hopes of French cinema.

Others 
In 1995, a care unit for suicidal young adults took his name at Lierneux (Belgium).
In 2008, the Patrick-Dewaere Prize, intended to reward the promising actors of French cinema, was created to replace the Jean-Gabin Prize that had existed since 1980.
On December 22, 2009, the Théâtre de Verdure esplanade located in the Parc des promenades of Saint-Brieuc, his hometown, was named Patrick-Dewaere esplanade, in the presence of Mado Maurin, Jean-François Vlérick, Luc Béraud and Gilles Durieux.

Filmography

References

External links

 
 
 Miou-Miou et les hommes de sa vie Miou-Miou : Coluche, Patrick Dewaere, Julien Clerc... les hommes de sa vie

1947 births
1982 deaths
French male film actors
Suicides by firearm in France
20th-century French male actors
Café de la Gare
1982 suicides